Pectinaria is a genus of sand tube-building annelid fanworms in the family Pectinariidae.

Species
Species within this genus include:
Pectinaria aegyptia (Savigny, 1822)
 Pectinaria antipoda Schmarda, 1861
 Pectinaria belgica (Pallas, 1766)
 Pectinaria bifurcata Blainville, 1828
 Pectinaria brevispinis Grube, 1878
 Pectinaria californiensis Hartman, 1941
 Pectinaria carnosa Wong & Hutchings, 2015
 Pectinaria chilensis Nilsson, 1928
 Pectinaria clava Grube, 1878
 Pectinaria conchilega Grube, 1878
 Pectinaria dimai Zachs, 1933
 Pectinaria dodeka Hutchings & Peart, 2002
 Pectinaria gouldii (Verrill, 1873)
 Pectinaria hartmanae (Reish, 1968)
 Pectinaria hiuchiensis Kitamori, 1965
 Pectinaria incerta (Chenu, 1842)
 Pectinaria kanabinos Hutchings & Peart, 2002
 Pectinaria kiiensis Katto, 1977
 Pectinaria nana Wesenberg-Lund, 1949
 Pectinaria ningalooensis Zhang & Hutchings, 2019
 Pectinaria nonatoi Nogueira, Ribeiro, Carrerette & Hutchings, 2019
 Pectinaria okudai (Imajima & Hartman, 1964)
 Pectinaria panava Willey, 1905
 Pectinaria papillosa Caullery, 1944
 Pectinaria parvibranchis Grube, 1878
 Pectinaria profunda Caullery, 1944
 Pectinaria regalis Verrill, 1901
 Pectinaria torquata Zhang & Qiu, 2017

References

External links

Terebellida
Polychaete genera